Bobo is a Swedish comic strip, created by Lars Mortimer, published periodically between 1978 and 1990.

The main character is the eponymous "troll bear", encountering adventures in the forest, and occasionally the town nearby.

He is fond of sandwiches with cucumbers, and always carries around his "flaxkikare", (lit. akin to "flash telescope"), a telescope which could transport the user to the area looked at.

"Bobo" had his own magazine from 1978 to 1989. A group of spin-off characters, "Gnuttarna", later had their own magazine.

Names of the magazine 
Bobo (1978–1985)
Bobo och skogsvännerna (1986–1988)
Bobo och Gnuttarna (1988–1989)
Gnuttarna (1990)
Gnuttarna & c:o (1985–1988), published parallel with Bobo
Christmas album (1979–1989)

References

1978 comics debuts
1990 comics endings
1978 establishments in Sweden
1990 disestablishments in Sweden
Comics characters introduced in 1978
Defunct magazines published in Sweden
Comics about bears
Fantasy comics
Fictional bears
Fictional Swedish people
Magazine mascots
Magazines established in 1978
Magazines disestablished in 1990
Swedish-language magazines
Swedish comics characters
Swedish comic strips
Comics magazines published in Sweden
Male characters in comics
Male characters in advertising
Mascots introduced in 1978

hu:Bobo (képregény)
fi:Bobo (sarjakuvalehti)
sv:Bobo